Miniodes maculifera is a moth of the family Erebidae first described by George Hampson in 1913. It is found in Africa, including Gabon and Uganda.

References

Catocalinae
Insects of Uganda
Owlet moths of Africa
Moths described in 1913